The Team Mini-MAX is a large family of single-seat, mid-wing, strut-braced, single engine aircraft, available in kit form for amateur construction. The first Mini-MAX had its first flight in 1984. Its name indicates its original design goals: a minimum-cost aircraft that requires a minimum of building space, time and skill, but which provides a maximum of enjoyment and performance.

The Mini-MAX family was originally produced by TEAM Incorporated of Bradyville, Tennessee. After that company was bankrupted by a lawsuit, production passed to Ison Aircraft also of Bradyville, Tennessee and next to JDT Mini-MAX of Nappanee, Indiana. The company was renamed Team Mini-Max LLC in 2012, with production in Niles, Michigan.

Development

The Mini-MAX models are all predominantly constructed from wood truss with plywood gussets and covered with doped aircraft fabric. The construction time to complete a Mini-MAX varies depending on the model chosen.  Many models feature open cockpits equipped with windshields. All versions feature a short-span wing of only , except the V-MAX and 1600R EROS, which have a  wingspan. The wing and horizontal stabilizer are both strut-braced: the wing is braced to the landing gear and the tail is braced from the horizontal tail surface to the fin. All models have conventional landing gear, with wheel pants as an option. Since the wing is braced to the mainwheels and the mainwheels are connected by a rigid axle, the pneumatic tires provide the only suspension.

The aircraft was originally intended to meet the requirements of the US FAR 103 Ultralight Vehicles category, including that category's maximum  empty weight. The original ultralight models of the Mini-MAX were equipped with the  Rotax 277 engine to achieve acceptable empty weights. Today the 1030F MAX 103 and 1100F Mini-MAX achieve an acceptable FAR 103 empty weight if they are equipped with the  Hirth F-33 powerplant. Other models use heavier engines which place them in the US Experimental - Amateur-built category.

The Mini-MAX was also developed into a high winged version, called the Hi-MAX. The two designs share much in the way of parts and design concept commonality.

Variants
1030F MAX-103
Single seat, open cockpit, mid-wing aircraft with the  Hirth F-33 engine. Still in production. Manufacturer claimed construction time 300-350 hours.
1030R MAX-103
Single seat, open cockpit, mid-wing aircraft with the  Rotax 277. First flight 1993, out of production, replaced by the 1030F. Manufacturer claimed construction time 350 hours. 250 completed and flown by 2011.
1100F Mini-MAX
Single seat, open cockpit, mid-wing aircraft with the  Hirth F-33 engine. Still in production. Manufacturer claimed construction time 250-300 hours.
1100R Mini-MAX
Single seat, open cockpit, mid-wing aircraft with the  Rotax 447 engine. First flight 1984, still in production. Manufacturer claimed construction time 250-300 hours. 600 completed and flown by 2011.
1200Z Z-MAX
Single seat, open cockpit, mid-wing aircraft with the  Zenoah G-50 engine. First flight 1991, out of production. Manufacturer claimed construction time 350 hours. 124 completed and flown by 2001. As this is a US aircraft the name is pronounced "Zee-Max".
1300Z Z-MAX
Single seat, enclosed cockpit, mid-wing aircraft with the  Zenoah G-50 engine. First flight 1990, out of production. Manufacturer claimed construction time 400 hours. 231 completed and flown by 2001. As this is a US aircraft the name is pronounced "Zee-Max".
1500R Sport
Single seat, open cockpit, mid-wing aircraft with the  Rotax 447 engine. First flight 1987, still in production. Manufacturer claimed construction time 300-350 hours. 200 completed and flown by 2011.
1550V V-MAX
Single seat, open cockpit, mid-wing aircraft with the  Volkswagen air-cooled engine and  wingspan. First flight 1993, still in production. Manufacturer claimed construction time 325-400 hours. 250 completed and flown by 2011.
1600R Sport
Single seat, enclosed cockpit, mid-wing aircraft with the  Rotax 447. First flight 1989, still in production. Manufacturer claimed construction time 325-400 hours. 315 completed and flown by 2011.
1650R EROS
Single seat, enclosed cockpit, mid-wing aircraft with the  Rotax 503 and  wingspan. Still in production. Manufacturer claimed construction time 325-400 hours. 300 completed and flown by 2011.

Specifications (1650R EROS)

See also

References

External links

1980s United States ultralight aircraft
Single-engined tractor aircraft
Mid-wing aircraft
Aircraft first flown in 1984